Gabriel Okechukwu (born 28 August 1995) is a Nigerian footballer who plays for on loan from Chabab Mohammédia Wydad AC as a striker.

Career 
Okechukwu is a product of Water FC Academy in Abuja. In February 2016 he signed a contract with Ukrainian club FC Karpaty.

Okechukwu was on the provisional squad for the 2015 FIFA U-20 World Cup, but eventually did not play any games for this team. In May 2015 he was called up for the Nigeria national football team in the 2017 Africa Cup of Nations qualification to play against Chad national football team, but again he did not play in this match.

In August 2018, Okechukwu joined Wydad Casablanca in Morocco. After only seven appearances in the 2018-19 season and three in the 2019-20 season, he was loaned out to Chabab Mohammédia in January 2020.

In January 2021, Nigerian forward  joined Consadole Sapporo FC in Japan. Gabriel Okechukwu joins the J1 League club on a three-year-deal that will keep him at the club until 2024, in a deal worth €800,000

International goals
Scores and results list Nigeria's goal tally first.

References

External links 

1995 births
Living people
Nigerian footballers
Nigerian expatriate footballers
St. George's F.C. players
FC Karpaty Lviv players
Akwa United F.C. players
Wydad AC players
SCC Mohammédia players
Ukrainian Premier League players
Botola players
Sportspeople from Lagos
Association football forwards
Nigerian expatriate sportspeople in Malta
Nigerian expatriate sportspeople in Ukraine
Nigerian expatriate sportspeople in Morocco
Expatriate footballers in Malta
Expatriate footballers in Ukraine
Expatriate footballers in Morocco
TEAP F.C. players
Hokkaido Consadole Sapporo players
Fukushima United FC players
J1 League players
J3 League players
Nigeria A' international footballers
2018 African Nations Championship players